Joost-Pieter Katoen (born October 6, 1964) is a Dutch theoretical computer scientist based in Germany. He is distinguished professor in Computer Science and head of the Software Modeling and Verification Group at RWTH Aachen University.
Furthermore, he is part-time associated to the Formal Methods & Tools group at the University of Twente.

Education

Katoen received his master's degree with distinction in Computer Science from the University of Twente in 1987. In 1990, he was awarded a Professional Doctorate in Engineering from  the Eindhoven University of Technology, and in 1996, he received his Ph.D. in computer science from the University of Twente.

Research
Katoen's main research interests are formal methods, computer aided verification, in particular model checking, concurrency theory, and semantics, in particular semantics of probabilistic programming languages. His research is largely tool and application oriented.

Together with Christel Baier he wrote and published the book Principles of Model Checking.

Career

From 1997 to 1999, Katoen was a postdoctoral researcher at the University of Erlangen-Nuremberg.
In 1999, he became an associate professor at the University of Twente, where he still holds a part-time position.
In 2004, he was appointed a full professor at RWTH Aachen University.

In 2013, Katoen became Theodore von Kármán Fellow and Distinguished Professor at RWTH Aachen University. Also in 2013, he was elected member of the Academia Europaea. In 2017, he received an honorary doctorate from Aalborg University. In 2018, Katoen was awarded the highly remunerated ERC Advanced Grant.

Katoen is a founding member of the IFIP Working Group (WG) 1.8 on Concurrency Theory and a member of the WG 2.2 Formal Description of Programming Concepts. From 2006 to 2010, he was engaged in the Review College of the British Engineering and Physical Sciences Research Council (EPSRC). Since 2015, he is chair of the Steering Committee of the European Joint Conferences on Theory and Practice of Software (ETAPS).

For his commitment to work-life balance, especially for young Ph.D. students with children, he was awarded the FAMOS Prize by RWTH Aachen University in 2017.

Personal life
Joost-Pieter Katoen was born in Krimpen aan den IJssel in 1964. Katoen is married and has three sons. He lives in Maastricht. In his private time, he enjoys cycling and listening to music.

See also
 Joost-Pieter Katoen's homepage.
 Software Modeling and Verification Group.
 List of publications on computer science bibliography site DBLP.

References

Living people
Dutch computer scientists
German computer scientists
Formal methods people
1964 births
Academic staff of RWTH Aachen University